Cymatoceras elegans is an extinct species of nautilitacean cephalopods in the family Cymatoceratidae. It is from the Cretaceous of Switzerland and the United Kingdom.

References

 

Prehistoric nautiloids
Fossil taxa described in 1816
Cretaceous cephalopods of Europe